Boekhorst is a surname of Dutch origin. People with the name include:

 Blaine Boekhorst (born 1993), Australian rules footballer
 Fieke Boekhorst (born 1957), Dutch hockey player
 Sven Boekhorst (born 1980), Dutch skater

See also
 Vrije en Lage Boekhorst ("Free and Low Boekhorst"), an abolished municipality in South Holland

Dutch-language surnames